Kobbefjord or Kobbefjorden may refer to the following landforms:

 Kobbefjorden, a small fjord in Svalbard, Norway
 Kangerluarsunnguaq Fjord, a small fjord in southwestern Greenland